Rockavon (foaled 1958) was a British Thoroughbred racehorse and sire, best known for winning the classic 2000 Guineas in 1961. After winning three races on minor tracks as a two-year-old and being well-beaten on his three-year-old debut Rockavon created a 66/1 upset when winning the 2000 Guineas, becoming the first horse trained in Scotland to win a classic. He subsequently only won one minor race and has been regarded as one of the least distinguished of classic winners. At the end of 1961 he was retired to stud where he made no impact as a sire of winners.

Background
Rockavon was a dark-coated bay horse with no white markings bred at the Biddlesden Park Stud on the border of Northamptonshire and Buckinghamshire. He was sent to the Newmarket sales as a foal in December 1958 and was bought by R. J. Donworth for 420 guineas. Ten months later Donworth sold the horse on at a profit when Rockavon was bought for 2,200 guineas by Thomas Yuill, a farmer from Strathaven. The colt was sent into training with George Boyd at his Tilton House stables near Dunbar. Boyd was one of the leading Scottish trainers of the time and had won major handicap races in England including the Lincoln and the Cambridgeshire.

Rockavon was sired by Rockefella, the only foal produced by the 1000 Guineas and Oaks winner Rockfel before her death at the age of six. Apart from Rockavon, Rockefella sired the filly Outcrop, who won the Yorkshire Oaks and the Park Hill Stakes in 1963. Rockavon was one of eight winners produced by the broodmare Cosmetic, a daughter of the July Cup winner Sir Cosmo. Cosmetic's dam Beautiful Girl was a half-sister of Aura, who produced the Doncaster Cup winner Auralia.

Racing career

1960:two-year-old season
As a two-year-old in 1960, Rockavon ran eight times at minor racecourses in Scotland and Northern England winning three races including his last two. He won the Neilsland Nursery and one other race at Hamilton Park, near Glasgow and a race at the since closed Stockton-on-Tees Racecourse in Yorkshire. In the Free Handicap, a ranking of the season's best juveniles, Rockavon did not receive a rating, suggesting that he was at least thirty pounds below the best horses of his generation.

1961:three-year-old season
The best two-year-olds seen in Britain in 1960 had either been fillies like Opaline and Sweet Solera, or sprinters like Floribunda, suggesting that the 1961 colts' classics might be rather sub-standard. Rockavon did little to establish himself as a contender for major honours on his seasonal debut, when he finished fourth in a handicap race at Newcastle. In the 2000 Guineas over Newmarket's Rowley Mile course on 26 April he started at odds of 66/1 in a field of twenty-two runners, with Pinturischio, who had won the Wood Ditton Stakes for unraced horses at the previous Newmarket meeting, being made the 7/4 favourite. George Boyd had planned to fly to Newmarket from Scotland but was delayed by fog at Edinburgh Airport and the colt was prepared at the course by Boyd's nephew, Tommy Craig, who had travelled down in Rockavon's horse-box. Ridden by Norman Stirk, Rockavon was always well positioned, took the lead a furlong from the finish, and won by two lengths from Prince Tudor and Irish-trained Time Greine, with Pinturischio in fourth. The subsequent Epsom Derby winner Psidium finished eighteenth. The colt's success, the first for a Scottish-trained horse in a British classic, was greeted enthusiastically in Scotland where Rockavon was described in the press as having "humbled the pride of England, Ireland and France". His owner, who had backed the horse at 100/1, said that while the win was unexpected, he had always hoped that the colt would be a good horse, having picked him out at the sales on his own initiative.

Rockavon reappeared in the Heddon Stakes over nine furlongs at Newcastle on 22 June and won from a single opponent, a four-year-old named Julia's Hamlet. He was then tried over one and a half miles in the King George VI and Queen Elizabeth Stakes at Ascot in July and finished third of the four runners behind Right Royal and St. Paddy. Rockavon returned to Scotland in September and finished unplaced in the Doonside Cup at Ayr. On his final appearance he was part of an international field for the Champion Stakes at Newmarket in October. He was among the leaders until two furlongs from the finish, but then faded to finish unplaced behind the French-trained Bobar.

Assessment
As noted above, Rockavon's two-year-old form was not good enough to merit his inclusion in the official Free Handicap. The independent Timeform organisation awarded him a rating of 120, as a three-year-old, making him their lowest-rated 2000 Guineas winner. In their book A Century of Champions, based on a modified version of the Timeform system, John Randall and Tony Morris rated Rockavon the worst 2000 Guineas winner of the 20th century, commenting that he benefited from "the most inept of competition".

Stud record
Rockavon was retired from racing to become a breeding stallion. He sired a few minor winners but nothing of any consequence and in 1970 he was exported to France where he did no better. His last reported foals were born in 1973.

Pedigree

Rockavon was inbred 3 × 4 to Gainsborough, meaning that this stallion appears in both the third and fourth generations of his pedigree.

References

1958 racehorse births
Racehorses bred in the United Kingdom
Racehorses trained in the United Kingdom
Thoroughbred family 2-n
2000 Guineas winners